Adelaide Comets FC are a soccer club based in Adelaide, South Australia. The club competes in the National Premier Leagues South Australia. They are based in Adelaide's western suburb of Mile End and play home games at Santos Stadium.

History
Adelaide Comets Football Club was formed in 1994 and were known as Adelaide Raiders Soccer Club who competed in the SAASL (South Australian Amateur Soccer League). To avoid confusion with another local soccer club which plays under the name of "Raiders", the playing name was changed to Adelaide Comets in 2001 when the club first fielded junior teams.

As Adelaide Raiders, the club won the South Australia Amateur Soccer League SAASL Saturday Division 2 Championship in its inaugural year and gained promotion to the SAASL Saturday Division 1 competition. In 1997, they established themselves as the states premier Amateur League side becoming Champions in Saturday's Division 1 Competition. In 2001, the club registered 5 teams in the South Australian Soccer Federation's (SASF) Junior Premier League.

Achieving this goal was the catalyst for the club changing its name to Adelaide Comets, to avoid confusion with Adelaide Raiders (Formerly Adelaide Croatia Raiders). During this time, the club's senior team continued to enjoy success in the SAASL winning consecutive Championships in 2001, 2002 and 2003. This ongoing success at the highest level of amateur competition generated the push for a move to a higher league for the Adelaide Comets. The club made several attempts over a number of years to find a place for itself within the SASF competition with no success.

Finally, with the implementation of a new governing body for the sport in South Australia, Adelaide Comets entered the newly formed State League in 2006 under the banner of the Football Federation South Australia (FFSA).

The club now boasts one of the largest junior based clubs in South Australia with 370 junior players, along with three SAASL Amateur men's teams, FFSA Open Age Women's and a respected seniors squad who after gaining promotion through the FFSA State and Premier League competitions now competes in the states top division of football, The FFSA Super League. Thus totalling an impressive number of nearly 500 registered players across the club.

Comets advanced to the final of the 2018 FFSA Federation Cup by defeating Cumberland United 3–2 in the Semi Final. They defeated Croydon Kings in the 2018 FFSA Federation Cup final awarding them a spot in the Round of 32 of the 2018 FFA Cup. On 25 July 2018 they defeated Football West State League 1 side Gwelup Croatia advancing to the round of 16 of the 2018 FFA Cup.

Promotion
In 2005 the club had been introduced into the newly formed FFSA State League moving on from the SAASL into the FFSA. Year 2007 saw The Comets gain promotion to the FFSA Premier League the second tier of South Australian football, after winning the State League Title within two seasons. Remarkably in 2008 The Comets were heading for promotion to the Super League but by only winning 1 out of their last 7 games they finished the season 3rd. In just their first season in the Premier League after coming to close to making the states first division, The Comets set their sights on becoming a Super League side. The Comets had a slow start to the year in 2009 but ended up finishing 4th by winning their last 7 out of 8 games and qualified into the top 5 finals competition. They then beat Croydon Kings 2–1 in the elimination final, only to lose against Cumberland United. The following year in 2010 would see the side yet again narrowly miss promotion after a defeat to Croydon in a winner gets promoted thriller.

In 2011 after years of coming agonizingly close The Comets had secured promotion after a stunning come from behind 2–1 victory over contenders Enfield City Falcons on the last day of regular season at Rushworth Reserve, clinching the Premier League Title. Lifting the club for its first time into the highest state-level association football competition, The FFSA Super League.

Players

Current squad

Club honours
2020 FSA NPL Premiers
2018 FFSA Federation Cup Winners
2012 FFSA Carlsberg Cup Champions
2011 South Australian Premier League Title, Under-19's Premier League Finals Champions
2007 South Australian State League Champions, Reserves State League Champions
2003 South Australian Amateur League Division 1, Champions
2002 South Australian Amateur League Division 1 Champions & South Australian Amateur League Division 1 Reserves Champions
2001 South Australian Amateur League Division 1 Champions & South Australian Women's Soccer Association Division 4 Champions
1998 Veterans, Division 2 Champions
1997 South Australian Amateur League Division 1 Champions
1994 South Australian Amateur League Division 2 Champions

References

External links
 Official Website

Com
National Premier Leagues clubs
Soccer clubs in South Australia
Association football clubs established in 1994
1994 establishments in Australia